Iglesia de Santa María (Arzabal) is a church in Asturias, Spain.

References

Churches in Asturias

es:Iglesia de Santa María (Arzabal)